Let It Ride is the second studio album by American blues rock band Buffalo Killers.  It was produced by Dan Auerbach of The Black Keys and released in July 2008 on Alive Naturalsound Records.  The first pressing of vinyl copies included a bonus live CD sourced from a fan's bootleg recording.

Track listing
All songs composed and arranged by Zachary Gabbard and Andrew Gabbard.

 "Get Together Now Today" – 4:43
 "Let It Ride" – 4:04
 "Leave the Sun Behind" – 4:51
 "If I Get Myself Anywhere" – 4:42
 "Give and Give" – 3:34
 "On the Prowl" – 2:56
 "It's a Shame" – 5:46
 "Heart in Your Hand" – 5:23
 "Take Me Back Home" – 3:53
 "Black Paper" – 4:08

Personnel
Buffalo Killers
 Zachary Gabbard – bass guitar, vocals
 Andrew Gabbard – guitar, vocals
 Joseph Sebaali – drums

Production
 Dan Auerbach – recording and production
 Bob Cesare – assistant engineer
 Andrew Hamilton – mastering
 Evil Wren – cover concept and design

Notes

2008 albums
Buffalo Killers albums
Alive Naturalsound Records albums
Albums produced by Dan Auerbach